This is a list of Canadian ministries, the collective body of ministers of the Crown that advises the Canadian monarch—presently King Charles III—on how to exercise their Crown prerogatives. Since Canadian Confederation, July 1, 1867, there have been 29 ministries.

In Canada, a ministry is formed when a new prime minister is appointed and dissolved when that individual leaves office. The one exception occurred in 1917, when incumbent Prime Minister Sir Robert Borden formed a new national unity government (the 10th Canadian Ministry) as a wartime coalition composed primarily of members of his own Conservative Party with some individual Liberal Party members of parliament.

In contrast to various other Commonwealth realms (such as Australia and the United Kingdom) where a "new" ministry is considered to have been formed after every general election regardless of the winner, elections in Canada do not cause dissolution of the ministry unless they result in the government's defeat. As such, the current 29th Ministry, chaired by Prime Minister Justin Trudeau, began governing shortly before the opening of the 42nd Parliament in 2015.

With a duration of 15 years, 87 days, the 8th Ministry, under the leadership of Sir Wilfrid Laurier, was the lengthiest; the 68-day-long 7th Ministry, under the leadership of Sir Charles Tupper, was the briefest. William Lyon Mackenzie King led three ministries—the 12th, 14th, and 16th—the most for any Canadian prime minister.

Ministries

See also
 List of Canadian federal parliaments
 List of prime ministers of Canada

References

External links
Parliament of Canada - Ministries

Ministries
Canada